Molokovo is the name of several inhabited localities in Russia.

Kostroma Oblast
As of 2010, one rural locality in Kostroma Oblast bears this name:
Molokovo, Kostroma Oblast, a village in Prigorodnoye Settlement of Nerekhtsky District

Moscow Oblast
As of 2010, two rural localities in Moscow Oblast bear this name:
Molokovo, Leninsky District, Moscow Oblast, a selo in Molokovskoye Rural Settlement of Leninsky District
Molokovo, Orekhovo-Zuyevsky District, Moscow Oblast, a village in Sobolevskoye Rural Settlement of Orekhovo-Zuyevsky District

Perm Krai
As of 2010, one rural locality in Perm Krai bears this name:
Molokovo, Perm Krai, a village in Permsky District

Pskov Oblast
As of 2010, two rural localities in Pskov Oblast bear this name:
Molokovo, Dedovichsky District, Pskov Oblast, a village in Dedovichsky District
Molokovo, Opochetsky District, Pskov Oblast, a village in Opochetsky District

Smolensk Oblast
As of 2010, one rural locality in Smolensk Oblast bears this name:
Molokovo, Smolensk Oblast, a village in Barsukovskoye Rural Settlement of Monastyrshchinsky District

Tver Oblast
As of 2010, three inhabited localities in Tver Oblast bear this name.

Urban localities
Molokovo, Molokovsky District, Tver Oblast, an urban-type settlement in Molokovsky District

Rural localities
Molokovo, Sandovsky District, Tver Oblast, a village in Sobolinskoye Rural Settlement of Sandovsky District
Molokovo, Staritsky District, Tver Oblast, a village in Staritsa Rural Settlement of Staritsky District

Vologda Oblast
As of 2010, three rural localities in Vologda Oblast bear this name:
Molokovo, Cherepovetsky District, Vologda Oblast, a village in Musorsky Selsoviet of Cherepovetsky District
Molokovo, Totemsky District, Vologda Oblast, a village in Pyatovsky Selsoviet of Totemsky District
Molokovo, Vologodsky District, Vologda Oblast, a village in Veprevsky Selsoviet of Vologodsky District

Yaroslavl Oblast
As of 2010, one rural locality in Yaroslavl Oblast bears this name:
Molokovo, Yaroslavl Oblast, a village in Babayevsky Rural Okrug of Danilovsky District